Tân Ấp station is a railway station on the North–South railway (Reunification Express) line in Vietnam. It serves the town of Tân Ấp in Quảng Bình Province. From 1933, the station also served as a terminus of the  Tân Ấp–Xóm Cục railway, the only stretch of railway opened as part of the aborted Thakhek–Tân Ấp railway.

It is uncertain when this stretch of railway was closed, but part, if not all of the railway was reopened by North Vietnam in the 1960s as part of their efforts to aid Vietcong guerillas travelling southwards along the Hồ Chí Minh trail, which begins just south of Xóm Cục in the Mụ Giạ Pass.

References

Buildings and structures in Quảng Bình province
Railway stations in Vietnam